15 Camelopardalis is a triple star system in the northern circumpolar constellation of Camelopardalis. It has the variable star designation DV Camelopardalis; 15 Camelopardalis is the Flamsteed designation. This is just visible to the naked eye as a dim, blue-white hued star with a baseline apparent visual magnitude of 6.13. It is a probable (99%) member of the Cas-Tau OB association.

This system includes a double-lined spectroscopic binary with an orbital period of 6.7 days and a large eccentricity of around 0.48, plus a third component in a wider orbit. The close pair consist of a very slowly rotating helium-weak star plus an ordinary mid-B-type star with a more rapid rotation rate. Together they form an Algol-type eclipsing binary with a depth of about 0.2 magnitude. The third component is a slowly pulsating B-type star.

References

B-type main-sequence stars
Slowly pulsating B stars
Eclipsing binaries
Algol variables
Camelopardalis (constellation)
Durchmusterung objects
Camelopardalis, 15
34233
024836
1719
Camelopardalis, DV
Helium-weak stars